Osvaldo Castellan (21 January 1951 – 23 October 2008) was an Italian cyclist. He competed in the team time trial at the 1972 Summer Olympics.

References

External links
 

1951 births
2008 deaths
Italian male cyclists
Olympic cyclists of Italy
Cyclists at the 1972 Summer Olympics
Sportspeople from Padua
Cyclists from the Province of Padua